Nerijus Radžius (born 27 August 1976) is a Lithuanian former footballer.

Career
On 5 August 2008, he scored a 30-yard free-kick against Rangers in the second-leg of the second qualifying round of the UEFA Champions League which helped knock-out the Scottish side in a 2–1 win for FBK Kaunas.

References

1976 births
Living people
Lithuanian footballers
Expatriate footballers in Latvia
Lithuania international footballers
FC Volgar Astrakhan players
Expatriate footballers in Russia
FC Chernomorets Novorossiysk players
Russian Premier League players
Lithuanian expatriate footballers
Association football defenders
Expatriate footballers in Poland
FBK Kaunas footballers
Expatriate footballers in Scotland
FK Žalgiris players
Lithuanian expatriate sportspeople in Russia
FK Sūduva Marijampolė players
Lithuanian expatriate sportspeople in Poland
Zagłębie Lubin players
Lithuanian expatriate sportspeople in Latvia
ŁKS Łódź players
People from Akmenė